The first series of the 2017 Hi-5 revival (also referred to as Series 17) aired between 15 May 2017 and 16 June 2017 on 9Go! in Australia. The series was produced independently with Julie Greene as executive producer. 

The series began production after the Nine Network renewed its partnership with the Hi-5 franchise in October 2016. This was the only series to feature an entirely new cast, introducing Courtney Clarke, Shay Clifford, Lachie Dearing, Joe Kalou and Bailey Spalding.

Production
The original Hi-5 television series aired its final series in 2011, as a result of the Nine Network selling the Hi-5 brand in 2012, following Nine's reported financial difficulties. The franchise was sold to Asian equity group, Asiasons (later Tremendous Entertainment Group), who produced a new television series entitled Hi-5 House, from 2013 to 2016, with no involvement from Nine.

On 14 October 2016, it was announced that the Nine Network had renewed its partnership with the Hi-5 franchise, revealing plans to revive the television series with an entirely new cast in 2017. The new series would feature a new cast and set, but retain the original team of producers and writers. Julie Greene, who had previously been a series producer of the original series, was announced as the executive producer of the revival. Greene became the brand's executive creative director in 2012 and was the executive producer for Hi-5 House. She stated "we're really excited to be working with Nine to develop a reinvigorated Hi-5 show". Auditions for the cast were held in November 2016, and the successful auditionees were revealed in December. Courtney Clarke, Shay Clifford, Joe Kalou and Bailey Spalding were announced to be joining Lachie Dearing to form the next generation Hi-5 group, chosen from over 450 applications. Dearing had previously joined the group in January 2016, and had to re-audition for his role. The quintet made their public debut at Carols by Candlelight on Christmas Eve.

The revival began production in January 2017 and was filmed at Pinewood Iskandar Malaysia Studios over six weeks. The series premiered on Nine's multichannel, 9Go!, on 15 May, airing at 9:00 AM weekdays. The premiere run averaged a viewership of 10,000. The series was released on online streaming service Stan on 1 October 2017.

Four of the five feature songs ("Abracadabra", "Stop and Go", "Living in a Rainbow" and "Party Street"), were previously featured throughout the show's original run. The fifth song, "Hi-5 Dance Off", made its debut in the new episodes. The series also featured new puppet characters, the Jupsters, who were introduced as the family of previously established character Jup Jup. The revival also retained a segment introduced in Hi-5 House, entitled The Chatterbox. This segment focuses on the discovery of language through simple words and phrases, and features the puppet Chatterbox, who teaches a toy robot named Tinka how to speak.

A second revived series was planned for 2018, with 45 episodes ordered by Nine. Production of the series halted before the Australian production office was closed, and filming did not resume. The five cast members later announced their departures from the group.

Cast

Presenters
 Courtney Clarke – Word Play
 Shay Clifford – Puzzles and Patterns
 Lachie Dearing – Shapes in Space
 Joe Kalou – Making Music
 Bailey Spalding – Body Move

Episodes

Awards and nominations

References

External links
 Hi-5 Website

2017 Australian television seasons
9Go! original programming